Hugh Seymour may refer to:

 Lord Hugh Seymour (1759–1801), British admiral
 Hugh Henry John Seymour (1790–1821), British Army officer and politician, MP for Antrim 1818–21
 Hugh Seymour, 6th Marquess of Hertford (1843–1912)
 Hugh Seymour, 8th Marquess of Hertford (1930–1997)